In algebraic geometry, a 3-fold or threefold is a 3-dimensional algebraic variety.

The Mori program showed that 3-folds have minimal models.

References